Sri Lanka is a tropical island situated close to the southern tip of India. The invertebrate fauna is as large as it is common to other regions of the world. There are about 2 million and counting species of arthropods found in the world. Due to this, it is very difficult to summarize the exact number of species found within a certain region.

The following list is about some minor insect orders recorded in Sri Lanka.

Jumping bristletails
Phylum: Arthropoda
Class: Insecta
Order: Archaeognatha

Archaeognatha, are an insect order of the subclass Apterygota, which means they are insects without wings at any stage of the lifecycle. In the evolution of insects, Archaeognatha are the most primitive insects currently exists in the world. They have elongated bodies and arched backs. They have three long caudal filaments, where two lateral filaments are known as cerci, and the medial one is an epiproct. 350 species of Jumping bristletails belong to two families have been identified. Two species are known from Sri Lanka.

Family: Machilidae
 Graphitarsus phillipsi
 Graphitarsus schmidi

Silverfish
Phylum: Arthropoda
Class: Insecta
Order: Zygentoma

Zygentoma is an insect order of the subclass Apterygota. The order includes silverfish, fishmoths, and the firebrats. All Zygentoma species have three long caudal filaments, where two lateral filaments are known as cerci, and the medial one is an epiproct or appendix dorsalis. There are five families in the order. 3 species are known from Sri Lanka.

Family: Ateluridae
 Assmuthia escherichiiFamily: Lepismatidae
 Ctenolepisma calva Namunukulina funambuliWebspinners
Phylum: Arthropoda
Class: Insecta
Order: Embioptera

The order Embioptera, commonly known as webspinners, are a small group of mostly tropical and subtropical insects, classified under the subclass Pterygota. The order has also been referred to as Embiodea or Embiidina. The name Embioptera ("lively wings") comes from Greek, εμβιος, embios meaning "lively" and πτερον, pteron meaning "wing", a name that has not been considered to be particularly descriptive for this group of fliers, perhaps instead referring to their remarkable speed of movement both forward and backward.

Over 360 embiopteran species have been described, along with estimates of around 2000 species being in existence today. There is some debate as to the exact phylogenetic classification of Embioptera, with the order having been classed as a sister group to both orders Zoraptera, and Phasmatodea,

The following list provide the lacewings currently identified in Sri Lanka. Only four species found from this order within the country.

Endemic species are denoted as E.

Family: OligotomidaeAposthonia ceylonicaAposthonia minusculaOligotoma humbertianaOligotoma saundersiiBooklice
Phylum: Arthropoda
Class: Insecta
Order: Psocoptera

Psocoptera are an order of insects that are commonly known as booklice, barklice or barkflies.  They first appeared in the Permian period, 295–248 million years ago.  They are often regarded as the most primitive of the hemipteroids. Their name originates from the Greek word ψῶχος, psokos meaning gnawed or rubbed and πτερά, ptera meaning wings. There are more than 5,500 species in 41 families in three suborders. Many of these species have only been described in recent years.

The Order Psocoptera is divided into three suborders. According to checklists by Smithers in 1967 and New in 1977, there are 67 accepted species of booklice found from Sri Lanka. The checklist of New was advanced with the full description of two subfamilies Epipsocidae and Pseudocaeciliidae, from Sri Lanka.

Family: Amphientomidae - Tropical barkliceParamphientomum nietneriSeopsis metallopsSeopsis superbaSeopsis vasantasenaSyllysis caudataSyllysis eratoSyllysis ritusamharaTineomorpha greenianaFamily: Amphipsocidae - Hairy-winged barkliceTaeniostigma elongatumFamily: Archipsocidae - Ancient barkliceArchipsocopsis biguttataArchipsocopsis fernandiFamily: Caeciliusidae - Lizard barkliceCaecilius  sp.Coryphosmila dolabrataDypsocus coleoptratusEnderleinella ceylonicaIsophanes palliatusValenzuela aridusValenzuela maculistigmaFamily: Calopsocidae - Common barkliceCalopsocus infelixFamily: Ectopsocidae - Outer barkliceEctopsocus aethiopsEctopsocus pigerFamily: Elipsocidae - Damp barkliceElipsocus boopsElipsocus impressusNepiomorpha cruciferaFamily: Epipsocidae - Elliptical barkliceEpipsocopsis delicataEpipsocopsis greeniEpipsocopsis hakgalensisEpipsocopsis peradenayensisEpipsocopsis taprobanensisFamily: Hemipsocidae - Leaf litter barkliceHemipsocus chloroticusHemipsocus roseusFamily: Lepidopsocidae - Scaly-winged barkliceEchmepteryx mihiraEchmepteryx sericeaLepium chrysochlorumLepium luridumLepolepis ceylonicaNepticulomima chalcomelasNepticulomima essigkeanaNepticulomima jacobsoniNepticulomima sakuntalaPerientomum acutipennePerientomum argentatumPerientomum ceylonicumPerientomum chrysargyriumPerientomum greeniPerientomum gregariumPerientomum morosumPerientomum trichopteryxPerientomum tristeProentomum personatumSoa flaviterminataScolopama halterataLepolepis ceylonica Family: Liposcelididae - BookliceEmbidopsocus minorEmbidopsocus oleaginusFamily: Myopsocidae - Mouse-like barkliceMyopsocus unduosusFamily: Peripsocidae - Stout barklicePeripsocus millotiPeripsocus paulianiFamily: Philotarsidae - Loving barkliceAaroniella maligawaHaplophallus orientalisFamily: Pseudocaeciliidae - False lizard barkliceAllopsocus medialisHeterocaecilius ornatusMesocaecilius pictipennisOphiodopelma hieroglyphicumOphiodopelma multipunctatumPseudocaecilius cribrariusPseudocaecilius lanatusPseudocaecilius molestusPseudocaecilius ornatusPseudocaecilius paraornatusPseudocaecilius zonatusFamily: Psocidae - Common barkliceAtrichadenotecnum quinquepunctatumBlaste obtusaCopostigma trimaculatumPsocidus consitusPsocidus oblitusPsococerastis taprobanesTrichadenotecnum circulareFamily: Stenopsocidae - Narrow barkliceStenopsocus apertusStenopsocus uniformisThrips
Phylum: Arthropoda
Class: Insecta
Order: Thysanoptera

Thrips (order Thysanoptera) are minute, slender insects with fringed wings (thus the scientific name. Other common names for thrips include thunderflies, thunderbugs, storm flies, thunderblights, storm bugs, corn flies and corn lice. Thrips species feed on a large variety of plants and animals by puncturing them and sucking up the contents. A large number of thrips species are considered pests, because they feed on plants with commercial value. Some species of thrips feed on other insects or mites and are considered beneficial, while some feed on fungal spores or pollen. Approximately 6,000 species have been described. Thrips are generally tiny (1 mm long or less) and are not good flyers , although they can be carried long distances by the wind. In the right conditions, like indoor grow rooms or greenhouses, many species can exponentially increase in population size and form large swarms because of a lack of natural predators, making them an irritation to humans.

The first comprehensive detailed work on Sri Lankan thrip fauna came through Schmutz in 1913. His checklist stood for more than 70 years with 43 new species. In 1997, Oda et al. rediscovered and updated the thrip diversity, but with small collections from Sri Lanka. The most recent work was done by Wijerathna, and he listed 16 species of thrips from 28 crops across the island. Currently, thrips documented within Sri Lanka included to 3 families - Aeolothripidae, Thripidae, and Phlaeothripidae, with 46 genera and 78 species.

Family: Aeolothripidae - Predatory thripsFranklinothrips vespiformisFamily: Thripidae - Common thripsAnaphothrips sudanensisBolacothrips striatopennatusBregmatothrips brachycephalusCaliothrips graminicolaCaliothrips indicusCopidothrips octarticulatusDendrothrips sexmaculatusHelionothrips brunneipennisHeliothrips haemorrhoidalisNoathrips prakashiPanchaetothrips indicusParthenothrips dracaenaePhibalothrips peringueyiRetithrips syriacusRhipiphorothrips cruentatusRhipiphorothrips pulchellusSelenothrips rubrocinctusTryphactothrips rutherfordiPseudodendrothrips ornatissimusChaetanaphothrips signipennisDeuterobrachythrips lineatusFrankliniella occidentalisFrankliniella schultzeiMegalurothrips distalisMegalurothrips typicusMegalurothrips usitatusMicrocephalothrips abdominalisNeohydatothrips samayunkurSciothrips cardamomiScirtothrips dorsalisStenchaetothrips biformisThrips coloratusThrips flavusThrips jlorumThrips hawaiiensisThrips longalatusThrips palmiThrips simplexThrips tabaciFamily: Phlaeothripidae - Tube-tailed thripsAleurodothrips fasciapennisAndrothrips flavipesBactrothrips idolomorphusChromatothrips annulicornisChromatothrips fasciatusChromatothrips plantaginisDiaphorothrips unguipesDinothrips spinosusDinothrips sumatrensiEcacanthothrips tibialisElaphrothrips denticollisElaphrothrips greeniElaphrothrips malayensisElaphrothrips procerEthirothrips angusticornisEthirothrips indicusEthirothrips obscurusEthirothrips stenomelasEthirothrips watsoniEumorphothrips albicornisGigantothrips schenklingiGigantothrips tibialisHaplothrips ceylonicusHaplothrips ganglbaueriHaplothrips gowdeyiHaplothrips terminalisLiothrips floridensisLiothrips karnyiLiothrips mirabilisLiothrips tropicusLiothrips vaneeckeiIschyrothrips crassusMecynothrips simplexNeosomerinthothrips affinisNeosomerinthothrips fructuumTeuchothrips brevisTeuchothrips longusTrichinothrips brevicepsFleas
Phylum: Arthropoda
Class: Insecta
Order: Siphonaptera

Fleas are insects that form the order Siphonaptera. They are wingless, with mouthparts adapted for piercing skin and sucking blood. Fleas are external parasites, living by hematophagy off the blood of mammals and birds. Over 2,000 species have been described worldwide.

The following list provide the fleas found in Sri Lanka. The first checklist of fleas in Sri Lanka was done by Iyengar in 1973. 20 species are recognized, more taxonomic study is required. The fleas studies were almost confined to parasitic sections, where W. W. A. Phillips documented 11 species of fleas in 1980.

Family: CeratophyllidaeMacrostylophora phillipsiNosopsyllus ceylonensisNosopsyllus tamilanusFamily: Ischnopsyllidae - Bat fleasAraeopsylla gestroiIschnopsyllus indicusThaumapsylla breviceps  - ssp. orientalis

Family: Pulicidae - Cat fleas
Ctenocephalides canis
Ctenocephalides felis
Pulex irritans
Xenopsylla cheopis

Family: Stivaliidae
Lentistivalius ferinus
Stivalius aporus
Stivalius phoberus

Caddisflies
Phylum: Arthropoda
Class: Insecta
Order: Trichoptera

The caddisflies are an order, Trichoptera, of insects with approximately 7,000 described species. Also called sedge-flies or rail-flies, they are small moth-like insects having two pairs of hairy membranous wings. They are closely related to Lepidoptera (moths and butterflies) which have scales on their wings, and the two orders together form the superorder Amphiesmenoptera. Caddisflies have aquatic larvae and are found in a wide variety of habitats such as streams, rivers, lakes, ponds, spring seeps, and temporary waters (vernal pools). The larvae of many species use silk to make protective cases of gravel, sand, twigs or other debris.

The caddisfly diversity in Sri Lanka is fairly studied from British times to present day. However, the first comprehensive work was done by Schmid in 1958. Then in 1973, Malicky updated the checklist. Currently 188 number of caddisfly species belongs to 18 families are identified from Sri Lanka.

Family: Anomalopsychidae
Ceylanopsyche asaka
Ceylanopsyche kabaragola
Ceylanopsyche kaltenbachi

Family: Calamoceratidae
Anisocentropus ittikulama
Ganonema falcatus

Family: Dipseudopsidae
Dipseudopsis notata

Family: Ecnomidae

Ecnomus ceylanicus
Ecnomus chusie
Ecnomus dutthangamani
Ecnomus helakanda
Ecnomus hinayana
Ecnomus indicus
Ecnomus lohaprasada
Ecnomus saddhatissa
Ecnomus tenellus
Ecnomus vaharika
Ecnomus vahasaba

Family: Goeridae
Goera katugalkanda
Goera katugastota 
Goera kirilagoda
Goera paragoda

Family: Glossosomatidae - Little black caddisflies

Agapetus anuragoda
Agapetus ayodhia
Agapetus hanumata
Agapetus kithmalie
Agapetus kumudumalie
Agapetus rama
Agapetus rawana
Agapetus rudis
Agapetus sita

Family: Helicopsychidae - Snail-case caddisflies
Helicopsyche amarawathi
Helicopsyche arayar
Helicopsyche euchloe
Helicopsyche gudrunae
Helicopsyche petri
Helicopsyche ruprawathi
Helicopsyche salika
Helicopsyche srilanka

Family: Hydrobiosidae
Hydropsyche flynni
Hydropsyche fryeri 
Hydropsyche katugahakanda
Hydropsyche malassanka

Family: Hydropsychidae - Net-spinning caddisflies

Amphipsyche meridiana
Amphipsyche sinhala
Cheumatopsyche curvata
Cheumatopsyche galahittigama
Cheumatopsyche galapitikanda
Cheumatopsyche kirimaduwa
Macrostactobia elawalikanda
Macrostemum indistinctum
Macrostemum kolenati
Macrostemum multifarium
Macrostemum nebulosum
Macrostemum pseudoneura
Macrostemum splendidum
Molanna taprobane
Oestropsyche vitrina
Potamyia nikalandugola
Pseudoleptonema godapitigama
Pseudoleptonema kalukandama

Family: Hydroptilidae - Micro caddisflies

Chrysotrichia aranuwa
Chrysotrichia dotalugola
Chrysotrichia hapitigola
Chrysotrichia hatnagola
Chrysotrichia porsawan
Chrysotrichia siriya
Hydroptila dikirilagoda
Hydroptila furcata
Hydroptila hemeli
Hydroptila kirilawela
Hydroptila kurukepitiya
Hydroptila mitirigalla
Hydroptila sumanmalie
Hydroptila upulmalie
Nietnerella hageni
Nyctiophylax abaya
Nyctiophylax devanampriya
Nyctiophylax hettigegama
Nyctiophylax tallawakanda
Nyctiophylax vetulya
Orthotrichia guruluhela
Orthotrichia hinipitigola
Orthotrichia indica
Orthotrichia litoralis
Orthotrichia udawarama
Oxyethira bogambara
Oxyethira galekoluma
Oxyethira incana
Oxyethira rachanee
Paduniella ceylanica
Paduniella mahanawana
Paduniella mahindra
Paduniella methinee
Paduniella pandya
Paduniella sanghamittra
Paduniella siveci
Paduniella subhakara
Paduniella thitima
Paduniella vattagamani
Paduniella vikramasinha
Parastactobia talakalahena
Plethus amogawarsa
Plethus bodikatuwa
Plethus cilamegha
Plethus cursitans
Plethus udawasadenna
Plethus vajrabodhi
Rhyacophila castanea 
Stactobia fischeri

Family: Lepidostomatidae - Bizarre caddisflies
Goerodes kanda
Goerodes ursinus

Family: Leptoceridae - Long-horned caddisflies

Adicella agastya
Adicella biramosa
Ceraclea isurumuniya
Gunungiella madakumbura
Gunungiella nimitra
Leptocerus anuradha
Leptocerus argentoniger
Leptocerus charopantaja
Leptocerus mahasena
Leptocerus mahawansa
Leptocerus parakum
Leptocerus posticus
Oecetis belihuloya
Oecetis biramosa 
Oecetis ceylanica
Oecetis dhatusena
Oecetis fahieni
Oecetis hamata
Oecetis jacobsoni
Oecetis lingua
Oecetis malighawa
Oecetis meghadouta
Oecetis naravitta
Oecetis nerviciliata
Oecetis punctatissima
Oecetis sumanasara
Parasetodes respersellus
Setodes argentoaureus
Tagalopsyche brunnea
Triaenodes lankarama
Triaenodes ornatus
leiochiton suwannee
Trichosetodes argentolineatus
Trichosetodes meghawanabaya
Triplectides ceylanicus

Family: Limnephilidae - Northern caddisflies
Diplectrona kirimaduhela
Diplectrona papilionacea
Diplectronella taprobanes

Family: Odontoceridae - Mortarjoint casemakers
Marilia mixta

Family: Philopotamidae - Fingernet caddisflies

Chimarra actinifera
Chimarra akarawitta
Chimarra auriceps
Chimarra auricoma
Chimarra ceylanica
Chimarra circularis
Chimarra confusa
Chimarra godagama
Chimarra jiraprapa
Chimarra lankana
Chimarra lewisi
Chimarra mitis
Chimarra prisna
Chimarra sandhamma
Chimarra sepulchralis
Chimarra telihigola
Chimarra uvana
Chimarra wiharawela

Family: Polycentropodidae - Tube-maker caddisflies

Pahamunaya layagammeda
Polyplectropus amarawathi
Polyplectropus matadapaya
Polyplectropus nubigenus
Polyplectropus parakrama
Pseudoneureclipsis hataya
Pseudoneureclipsis maliboda
Pseudoneureclipsis narita
Pseudoneureclipsis nissanka
Pseudoneureclipsis thuparama
Pseudoneureclipsis watagoda
Pseudoneureclipsis wilaiwan
Pseudoneureclipsis yuwadee

Family: Psychomyiidae - Net-tube caddisflies
Lype tipmanee

Family: Xiphocentronidae
Abaria margaritifera

Twisted-winged parasites
Phylum: Arthropoda
Class: Insecta
Order: Strepsiptera

Order Strepsiptera, commonly called, twisted-wing parasites, are an endopterygote order of insects. The order consists with nine extant families with about 600 species. Adults in most of their lives are spent as endoparasites in other insects, such as bees, wasps, leafhoppers, silverfish, and cockroaches. Males have  well-developed pair of hind-wings and reduced fore-wings. Females wingless and usually do not leave their hosts.

The first scientific observation and detailed work on strepsipterans of Sri Lanka was done by Kathirithamby in 1994. In 1997, Kifune discovered 20 strepsipterans from Sri Lanka, with 7 new species. All these new species genera are endemic to the country.

Family: Corioxenidae
Triozocera ceylonensis

Family: Elenchidae
Elenchus tenuicornis

Family: Halictophagidae
Halictophagus minimus
Halictophagus peradenyia
Halictophagus sodeni
Halictophagus spectrus
Tridactylophagus ceylonensis

Family: Mengenillidae
Mengenilla orientalis

Family: Myrmecolacidae
Myrmecolax nietneri
Stichotrema ambiguum
Stichotrema acutipennis
Stichotrema ceylonense
Stichotrema dallatorreanum
Stichotrema krombeini
Stichotrema minor
Stichotrema simile

Family: Stylopidae
Paraxenos australiensis
Paraxenos krombeini
Paraxenos occidentalis

Lice
Phylum: Arthropoda
Class: Insecta
Order: PhthirapteraPhthiraptera, is an insect order, which comprise more than 5,000 species of wingless insects. All lice are obligate parasites which live externally on warm-blooded mammals and birds. The three cosmopolitan species of lice live within the humans, on head, body and pubic region. They are divided into two groups, sucking lice and chewing lice. The exact number of lice in Sri Lanka is not known. Only some species have been documented.

Family: Haematomyzidae
Haematomyzus elephantis

Family: Hoplopleuridae
Hoplopleura maniculata

Family: Menoponidae
Myrsidea clayae

Family: Pediculidae
Pediculus humanus
Pediculus humanus capitis
Pediculus humanus humanus

Family: Pthiridae
Pthirus pubis

Scorpionflies
Phylum: Arthropoda
Class: Insecta
Order: MecopteraMecoptera is an insect order with about 600 described species. They are commonly known as scorpionflies, due to enlarged genitals possessed by males, which resemble the stinger of a scorpion. They are one of major pollinators gymnosperms along with bees. Detailed work on mecopterans in Sri Lanka not yet carried out. Two species are known to live in Sri Lanka.

Family: Bittacidae - hangingflies
Bittacus henryi
Bittacus insularis

Stoneflies
Phylum: Arthropoda
Class: Insecta
Order: PlecopteraPlecoptera' is an insect order with about 3,500 described species with worldwide distribution. They are one of the most primitive winged insects. The body is very simple, chewing mandibles, large compound eyes with two or three ocelli. Detailed work on plecopterans in Sri Lanka not yet carried out. Eight species within two families are known to live in Sri Lanka.

Family: Perlidae Neoperla angulateNeoperla inexspectataNeoperla triangulatePhanoperla nanaPhanoperla srilankaPhanoperla testaceaPhanoperla weddaFamily: Polyplacidae - Spiny rat liceNeohaematopinus ceylonicus''

References

 
Insects, Minor
Sri Lanka